Elections were held on November 2, 2010, to determine Washington's nine members of the United States House of Representatives. Representatives were elected for two-year terms to serve in the 112th Congress from January 3, 2011, until January 3, 2013. Nonpartisan blanket primary elections were held on August 17, 2010.

Of the nine elections, the races in the 2nd, 3rd and 8th districts were rated as competitive by CQ Politics, The Rothenberg Political Report and Sabato's Crystal Ball, while The Cook Political Report rated the 2nd, 3rd, 8th and 9th districts as competitive. Every incumbent was re-elected, with the exception of Democrat Brian Baird, the U.S. representative  for Washington's 3rd congressional district, who retired rather than seeking re-election. Baird was succeeded by Jaime Herrera Beutler, a Republican.

In total, five Democrats and four Republicans were elected. In the November elections a total of 2,479,409 votes were cast, of which 1,296,502 (52 percent) were for Democratic candidates, 1,135,166 (46 percent) were for Republican candidates, and 47,741 (2 percent) were for an independent candidate.

Overview
Results of the 2010 United States House of Representatives elections in Washington by district:

District 1

In 2010 the 1st district included Bothell, Edmonds, Lynnwood and parts of Kirkland, Redmond and Shoreline. The district's population was 77 percent white, 10 percent Asian and 6 percent Hispanic (see Race and ethnicity in the United States Census); 94 percent were high school graduates and 41 percent had received a bachelor's degree or higher. Its median income was $73,943. In the 2008 presidential election the district gave 62 percent of its vote to Democratic nominee Barack Obama and 36 percent of its vote to Republican nominee John McCain.

Democrat Jay Inslee, who took office in 1999, was the incumbent. Inslee was re-elected in 2008 with 68 per cent of the vote. In 2010 Inslee's opponent in the general election was James Watkins, a businessman and a member of the Republican Party. Matthew Burke, a financial planner, also ran as a Republican; and David D. Schirle, a former physician and a member of the Washington National Guard, ran as an independent candidate.

Inslee raised $1,403,962 and spent $1,270,456. Watkins raised $351,477 and spent $339,770. Burke raised $51,135 and spent $49,931. Schirle raised $9,602 and spent $12,842.

In a Republican internal poll conducted in March 2010 by Moore Information, with a sample size of 300 registered voters, 41 percent of respondents supported Inslee while 27 percent favored Watkins. Prior to the election FiveThirtyEights forecast gave Inslee a 100 percent chance of winning, and projected that he would receive 62 percent of the vote to Watkins's 36 percent. On election day Inslee was re-elected with 58 percent of the vote to Watkins's 42 percent.

Inslee resigned in March 2012 in order to run for Governor of Washington. He was elected to that office in November 2012. Watkins unsuccessfully ran for the position of state auditor in 2012.

Primary results
 
 
 
 
 
 
 

General election
Polling

 
 
 
 
 

External links
 
 
 
 

District 2

The 2nd district included Bellingham, Marysville and parts of Everett. The district's population was 83 percent white and 8 percent Hispanic (see Race and ethnicity in the United States Census); 90 percent were high school graduates and 25 percent had received a bachelor's degree or higher. Its median income was $55,887. In the 2008 presidential election the district gave 56 percent of its vote to Democratic nominee Barack Obama and 42 percent to Republican nominee John McCain. In 2010 the district had a Cook Partisan Voting Index of D+3.

Democrat Rick Larsen, who took office in 2001, was the incumbent. Larsen was re-elected in 2008 with 62 percent of the vote. In 2010 Larsen's opponent in the general election was John Koster, a former member of the Washington House of Representatives and a member of the Republican Party. John Carmack, a structural-mechanical designer and contractor, also ran as a Republican; while Larry Kalb, a member of the Democratic State Committee; and Diana McGinness, a retired fraud investigator, also ran as Democrats.

Larsen raised $2,028,596 and spent $2,080,326. Koster raised $1,100,868 and spent $1,096,191. Kalb raised $22,436 and spent $20,824. McGinness raised $4,922 and spent $4,741.

A Republican internal poll of 300 likely voters conducted by Moore Information in April 2010 found 44 percent of respondents intended to vote for Larsen, while 37 percent favored Koster. In June 2010 Koster's campaign manager cited a poll of 784 respondents conducted for Koster's campaign, in which Koster led Larsen by around 53 percent to 47 percent; however he did not provide a hard copy of the results, which Larsen's campaign manager said were inaccurate. In a poll conducted in August and September 2010 by SurveyUSA, with a sample size of 612 likely voters, 50 percent of respondents supported Koster while 46 percent favored Larsen and 4 percent were undecided. In a SurveyUSA poll of 576 likely voters conducted later in September 2010, Larsen led with 50 percent to Koster's 47 percent, and 3 percent were undecided. In SurveyUSA's final poll of 643 likely and actual voters, conducted in October 2010, Larsen led with 50 percent to Koster's 46 percent, and 3 percent were undecided.

In October 2010, The Cook Political Report rated the race as "Lean Democratic" and CQ Politics and Sabato's Crystal Ball rated the race as "Leans Democratic". In November 2010, The Rothenberg Political Report rated the race as "Lean Democrat". Prior to the election FiveThirtyEights forecast gave Larsen a 74 percent chance of winning and projected that he would receive 52 percent of the vote to Koster's 48 percent.

Larsen was re-elected with 51 percent of the vote to Koster's 49 percent. After the initial count Koster led by less than 1,500 votes; however Larsen took the lead on November 3 and was later declared the winner. Larsen was again re-elected in 2012 and in 2014, while Koster unsuccessfully ran in the redrawn 1st district in the 2012 election.

Primary results
 
 
 
 
 
 
 
 

General election
Polling

Results

 
 
 
 

External links
 
 
 
 
 

District 3

The 3rd district included Vancouver and part of Olympia. The district's population was 85 percent white and 6 percent Hispanic (see Race and ethnicity in the United States Census); 89 percent were high school graduates and 24 percent had received a bachelor's degree or higher. Its median income was $54,813. In the 2008 presidential election the district gave 53 percent of its vote to Democratic nominee Barack Obama and 45 percent to Republican nominee John McCain. In 2010 the district had a Cook Partisan Voting Index of D+0.

Democrat Brian Baird, who took office in 1999, was the incumbent. Baird was re-elected in 2008 with 64 percent of the vote. In 2010 Baird retired rather than seeking re-election. The candidates in the general election were Jaime Herrera Beutler, a Republican, and Dennis Heck, a Democrat, both of whom were members of the Washington House of Representatives. Cheryl Crist, a Democratic Precinct Committee Officer, also ran as a Democrat; while David B. Castillo, a U.S. Navy veteran, and David W. Hedrick, a management accountant, also ran as Republicans. Norma Jean Stevens, a small business owner, ran as an independent candidate. Deb Wallace, a member of the Washington House of Representatives, Maria Rodriguez-Salazar, a nurse; and Craig Pridemore, a member of the Washington Senate, ran as Democrats but dropped out of the race in February, March and June 2010 respectively. Democrat Brendan Williams, a member of the state House of Representatives, announced in December 2009 that he would not run. Jon Russell, the mayor pro tem of Washougal, ran as a Republican but ended his campaign in February 2010. Richard DeBolt, the leader of the Republican party in the state House of Representatives, announced in January 2010 that he would not run.

Herrera Beutler raised $1,557,221 and spent $1,534,650. Heck raised $1,988,495 and spent $1,965,997. Castillo raised $282,516 and spent £275,436. Crist raised $14,511 and spent $17,141. Hedrick raised $41,358 and spent $27,715. Pridemore raised $114,782 and spent $114,681. Russell raised $30,478 and spent $30,479. Wallace raised $56,907 and spent the same amount.

In a poll of 562 likely voters, conducted in August 2010 by SurveyUSA, 54 percent of respondents supported Herrera Beutler while 41 percent favored Heck and 5 percent were undecided. An internal poll conducted between September 7 and 9, 2010 for Heck's campaign by Greenberg Quinlan Rosner, with a sample size of 502 likely voters, found Herrera Beutler at 47 percent and Heck at 44 percent. In a SurveyUSA poll conducted between September 12 and 14, 2010, with a sample size of 552 likely voters, Herrera Beutler led again with 52 percent to Heck's 43 percent, while 4 percent were undecided. A poll conducted by Penn Schoen Berland from October 2 until October 7, 2010, with a sample size of 400 likely voters, found Herrera leading with 42 percent to Heck's 40 percent. In a SurveyUSA poll conducted from October 10 until October 12, 2010, with a sample size of 597 likely voters, 53 percent of respondents intended to vote for Herrera Beutler while 42 percent favored Heck and 6 percent were undecided. In SurveyUSA's final poll, conducted between October 24 and 25, 2010, with a sample size of 640 likely and actual voters, Herrera Beutler led with 50 percent to Heck's 46 percent, and 4 percent were undecided.

Sabato's Crystal Ball rated the race as "Leans Republican". In October 2010, The Cook Political Report rated the race as "Lean Republican" and CQ Politics rated the race as "Leans Republican". In November 2010, The Rothenberg Political Report rated the race as "Toss-up/Tilt Republican". Prior to the election ''FiveThirtyEights forecast gave Herrera Beutler an 83 percent chance of winning and projected that she would receive 53 percent of the vote to Heck's 47 percent. On election day Herrera Beutler was elected with 53 percent of the vote to Heck's 47 percent. Herrera Beutler was re-elected in 2012, when Heck successfully ran in the newly created 10th district; and in 2014.

Primary results
 
 
 
 
 
 
 
 
 

General election
Polling

Results

 
 
 
 

External links
 
 
 
 
 
 

District 4

The 4th district included Kennewick, Pasco, Richland and Yakima. The district's population was 64 percent white and 31 percent Hispanic (see Race and ethnicity in the United States Census); 78 percent were high school graduates and 19 percent had received a bachelor's degree or higher. Its median income was $45,616. In the 2008 presidential election the district gave 58 percent of its vote to Republican nominee John McCain and 40 percent to Democratic nominee Barack Obama.

Republican Doc Hastings, who took office in 1995, was the incumbent. Hastings was re-elected in 2008 with 63 percent of the vote. In 2010 Hastings's opponent in the general election was Jay Clough, a member of the United States Marine Corps who ran as a Democrat. Shane Fast, a business owner, also ran as a Republican. Rex A. Brocki, a chapter president of Young Americans for Freedom, ran as a Tea Party candidate. Mary Ruth Edwards, a teacher, ran as the Constitution Party candidate. Leland Yialelis, a pastor, ran as an independent candidate.

Hastings raised $1,056,576 and spent $1,089,271. Clough raised $119,993 and spent $118,863. Yialelis raised $5,534 and spent the same amount. Prior to the election FiveThirtyEights forecast gave Hastings a 100 percent chance of winning, and projected that he would receive 67 percent of the vote to Clough's 30 percent.

On election day Hastings was re-elected with 68 percent of the vote to Clough's 32 percent. Hastings was again re-elected in 2012, while Clough ran for a seat in the Washington House of Representatives. Hastings retired rather than seeking re-election in 2014 and will be succeeded by Republican Dan Newhouse.

Primary results
 
 
 
 
 
 
 
 
 

General election results

 
 
 
 

External links
 
 
 
 
 

District 5

The 5th district included Spokane, Spokane Valley and Walla Walla. The district's population was 86 percent white and 6 percent Hispanic (see Race and ethnicity in the United States Census); 91 percent were high school graduates and 26 percent had received a bachelor's degree or higher. Its median income was $45,344. In the 2008 presidential election the district gave 52 percent of its vote to Republican nominee John McCain and 46 percent to Democratic nominee Barack Obama.

Republican Cathy McMorris Rodgers, who took office in 2005, was the incumbent. McMorris Rodgers was re-elected in 2008 with 65 percent of the vote. In 2010 McMorris Rodgers's opponent in the general election was Daryl Romeyn, a television presenter and a member of the Democratic Party. Clyde Cordero, a vice president of the American GI Forum; David R. Fox, a lawyer; and Barbara Lampert, a retired nurse's aide, also ran as Democrats. Randall Yearout, an operations engineer and business owner, ran as a Constitution Party candidate.

McMorris Rodgers raised $1,453,240 and spent $1,381,220. Romeyn raised $2,320 and spent $13,318. Cordero raised $18,397 and spent $15,525. Yearout raised $7,644 and spent $10,151.

Prior to the election FiveThirtyEights forecast gave McMorris Rodgers a 100 percent chance of winning, and projected that she would receive 68 percent of the vote to Romeyn's 30 percent. On election day McMorris Rodgers was re-elected with 64 percent of the vote to Romeyn's 36 percent. McMorris Rodgers was again re-elected in 2012, when Romeyn was elected as a County Commissioner in Spokane County; and in 2014.

Primary results

 
 
 
 
 
 
 
 

General election results

 
 
 
 

External links
 
 
 
 

District 6

The 6th district included Bremerton, University Place and parts of Lakewood, Parkland and Tacoma. The district's population was 76 percent white, 7 percent Hispanic, 5 percent black and 5 percent Asian (see Race and ethnicity in the United States Census); 89 percent were high school graduates and 22 percent had received a bachelor's degree or higher. Its median income was $48,170. In the 2008 presidential election the district gave 57 percent of its vote to Democratic nominee Barack Obama and 40 percent to Republican nominee John McCain.

Democrat Norm Dicks, who took office in 1977, was the incumbent. Dicks was re-elected in 2008 with 67 percent of the vote. In 2010 Dicks's opponent in the general election was Doug Cloud, a lawyer and a member of the Republican Party. Jesse Young, a software engineer, also ran as a Republican.

Dicks raised $1,412,760 and spent $1,582,738. Cloud raised $118,128 and spent $116,474. Young raised $35,351 and spent $35,295. In an internal poll with a sample size of 1,262 likely voters, conducted by Wenzel Strategies for Cloud's campaign in October 2010, 609 respondents intended to vote for Cloud while 558 favored Dicks and 95 were unsure.

Prior to the election ''FiveThirtyEights forecast gave Dicks a 97 percent chance of winning, and projected that he would receive 57 percent of the vote to Cloud's 43 percent. On election day Dicks was re-elected with 58 percent of the vote to Cloud's 42 percent. In 2012, Dicks retired rather than seeking re-election and was succeeded by Democrat Derek Kilmer, while Cloud ran for the seat again.

Primary results

General election

Polling

Results

External links

District 7

The 7th district included parts of Seattle and Shoreline. The district's population was 67 percent white, 13 percent Asian, 8 percent black and 7 percent Hispanic (see Race and ethnicity in the United States Census); 91 percent were high school graduates and 50 percent had received a bachelor's degree or higher. Its median income was $60,620. In the 2008 presidential election the district gave 83 percent of its vote to Democratic nominee Barack Obama and 15 percent to Republican nominee John McCain.

Democrat Jim McDermott, who took office in 1989, was the incumbent. McDermott was re-elected in 2008 with 84 percent of the vote. In 2012 McDermott's opponent in the general election was Bob Jeffers-Schroder, a member of Citizens' Climate Lobby who ran as an independent candidate. Bill Hoffman, a screenwriter and film producer; Don Rivers, an advisor to elected officials; and Scott Sizemore, the leader of the Seattle Youth and Beauty Brigade, also ran as Democrats. S. Sutherland, a renewable energy researcher, also ran as an independent candidate.

McDermott raised $582,232 and spent $568,649. Hoffman raised $14,856 and spent $14,843. Rivers raised $4,698 and spent $9,623.

Prior to the election FiveThirtyEight gave McDermott a 100 percent chance of winning. On election day McDermott received 83 percent of the vote to Jeffers-Schroder's 17 percent. McDermott was again re-elected in 2012 and in 2014.

Primary results

General election results

External links

District 8

The 8th district included Bellevue, Sammamish, and parts of Auburn, Kent, Renton and South Hill. The district's population was 76 percent white, 11 percent Asian and 6 percent Hispanic (see Race and ethnicity in the United States Census); 93 percent were high school graduates and 41 percent had received a bachelor's degree or higher. Its median income was $82,403. In the 2008 presidential election the district gave 56 percent of its vote to Democratic nominee Barack Obama and 42 percent to Republican nominee John McCain. In 2010 the district had a Cook Partisan Voting Index of D+3.

Republican Dave Reichert, who took office in 2005, was the incumbent. Reichert was re-elected in 2008 with 53 percent of the vote. In 2010 his opponent in the general election was Suzan DelBene, a businesswoman who ran as a Democrat. Keith Arnold, an accounting technician for the federal government; Tom Cramer, a small business owner; and Boleslaw (John) Olinski, a social worker with the Washington Department of Social and Health Services, also ran as Democrats. Tim Dillon, a member of the Yarrow Point town council; and Ernest Huber, a retired lieutenant commander in the United States Navy, also ran as Republicans. Robin Adair, who ran for the U.S. Senate in 2006; and Caleb Love Mardini, a marketing and business consultant, ran as independent candidates.

Reichert raised $2,793,788 and spent $2,770,293. DelBene raised $4,024,786 and spent $3,942,493. Cramer raised $72,140 and spent $72,132. Mardini raised $3,156 and spent $1,813.

In a poll of 657 likely voters conducted by SurveyUSA in August and September 2010, 54 percent of respondents supported Reichert while 41 percent favored DelBene and 5 percent were undecided. In a SurveyUSA poll of 579 likely voters conducted later in September 2010, Reichert led with 52 percent to DelBene's 45 percent with 4 percent undecided. An internal poll by Fairbank, Maslin, Maullin, Metz & Associates for DelBene's campaign, conducted on October 4 and 5, 2010, with a sample size of 400 likely voters, found Reichert leading with 48 percent to DelBene's 44 percent, while 8 percent chose "undecided/other". A poll of 1,036 likely voters by Public Policy Polling for Daily Kos, conducted on October 9 and 10, 2010, found Reichert leading with 49 percent to DelBene's 46 percent, and 5 percent undecided. In a SurveyUSA poll of 639 likely and actual voters conducted between October 18 and 20, 2010, 52 percent supported Reichert, 45 percent supported DelBene, and 3 percent were undecided.

Sabato's Crystal Ball rated the race as "Leans Republican" and noted that "Reichert has the difficult task of defending his seat and voting record as an incumbent". In October 2010 The Cook Political Report rated the race as "Likely Republican" and CQ Politics rated the race as "Leans Republican". In November 2010, The Rothenberg Political Report rated the race as "Republican Favored". Prior to the election, FiveThirtyEight'''s forecast gave Reichert a 95 percent chance of winning and projected that he would receive 56 percent of the vote to DelBene's 44 percent.

On election day Reichert was re-elected with 52 percent of the vote to DelBene's 48 percent. Reichert was again re-elected in 2012, when DelBene was elected to represent the 1st district; and in 2014.

Primary results

 
 
 
 
 
 
 
 
 
 
 

General election
Polling

Results

 
 
 
 

External links

 
 
 
 
 
 

District 9

The 9th district included Federal Way and parts of Kent, Lacey, Lakewood, Puyallup and Renton. The district's population was 68 percent white, 10 percent Hispanic, 9 percent Asian and 7 percent black (see Race and ethnicity in the United States Census); 89 percent were high school graduates and 23 percent had received a bachelor's degree or higher. Its median income was $56,522. In the 2008 presidential election the district gave 58 percent of its vote to Democratic nominee Barack Obama and 40 percent to Republican nominee John McCain. In 2010 the district had a Cook Partisan Voting Index of D+5.

The incumbent was Democrat Adam Smith, who took office in 1997. Smith was re-elected in 2008 with 65 percent of the vote. In 2010 his opponent in the general election was Republican Dick Muri, a member of the Pierce County Council. Jim Postma, a retired engineer and rocket scientist, also ran as a Republican; and Roy Olson, a government actuary, ran as a Green Party candidate. Tom Campbell, a member of the Washington House of Representatives, had planned to seek the Republican nomination but ended his campaign in September 2009.

Smith raised $948,533 and spent $1,355,512. Muri raised $240,210 and spent the same amount. Postma raised $168,744 and spent $114,057. Olson raised $1,941 and spent the same amount.

In a poll of 586 likely voters conducted by SurveyUSA in September 2010, 49 percent of respondents intended to vote for Smith while 46 percent supported Muri and 5 percent were undecided. A poll of 400 likely voters, conducted later that month by the Benenson Strategy Group for Smith's campaign, found Smith leading with 54 percent to Muri's 35 percent, and 11 percent unsure. Another SurveyUSA poll, conducted in October 2010 with a sample size of 590 likely and actual voters, found Smith again leading with 49 percent to Muri's 46 percent, and 5 percent undecided.

In October 2010 The Cook Political Report rated the race as "Likely Democratic". Prior to the election FiveThirtyEight'''s forecast gave Smith a 94 percent chance of winning and projected that he would receive 55 percent of the vote to Muri's 45 percent. On election day Smith was re-elected with 55 percent of the vote to Muri's 45 percent. Smith was again re-elected in 2012, when Muri unsuccessfully ran in the newly created Washington's 10th congressional district; and in 2014.

Primary results

General election

Polling

Results

External links

See also
 List of United States representatives from Washington
 United States congressional delegations from Washington

References

External links
 

Washington
2010
United States House of Representatives